Lichens of Soldiers Delight Natural Environmental Area, a nature reserve located in Baltimore County, Maryland.

The Soldiers Delight Natural Environment Area
The land consists of both serpentine barren and upland forest habitats. 

Chromite was mined at Soldiers Delight NEA until 1860 by Isaac Tyson, and some of the old mine shafts are still present. Four marked trails transverse the area and are a favorite hiking place for both humans and dogs.

The most distinctive feature about Soldiers Delight NEA is the number of rare and endangered plants that occur on the serpentine barrens, including some of the wildflowers of Soldiers Delight. These endangered species include the sandplain gerardia, serpentine aster, flameflower, and fringed gentian.

Lichenology at Soldiers Delight NEA
Lichenology began at the Soldiers Delight NEA in 1976, when Allen C. Skorepa, Arnold Norden , and Donald Windler were awarded a grant from the Power Plant Siting Program of the Maryland Department of Natural Resources to survey the lichens of Maryland. They surveyed the lichens from many areas throughout the state; one of which was Soldiers Delight. In 1977, they published their results and reported one location for each species of lichen that they identified. Thus, while they may have collected a particular species from numerous places they documented only one. So while they found numerous species of lichens at Soldiers Delight, only a few got recorded in their publication.

Dr. Elmer G. Worthley of Baltimore County also had an interest in lichens and collected throughout Maryland and New England, but the Soldiers Delight Area was one of his favorite places.

All of the lichens collected by Skorepa, Norden, and Windler were deposited in the herbarium at Towson University, Baltimore, Maryland. And all of the lichens in Elmer Worthley's herbarium were sent to the Lichen Herbarium at the New York Botanical Garden in 2001.

Lichen reference acronyms
The following list of lichen species found at Soldiers Delight is based upon these three sources, with acronyms used below:
1977 publication by Skorepa, Norden and Windler [S,N,W]
the species of lichens from Soldiers Delight in Elmer Worthley's personal herbarium [EGW]
Ed Uebel's observations [ECU]

Listings
Acarospora fuscata [ECU] Growing on a boulder along west side of Deer Park Road; N 39o24.909' W 076o50.171' Google Map  (June 2003)
Acarospora schleicheri [S,N,W] Growing on serpentine rock.
Anaptychia palmulata [ECU] Growing on bark at the base of a white oak in a woodland on the western side of Deer Park Road, south of the Visitor's Center Entrance. N 39o24.576' W 076o50.152' Google Map  (9 May 2006) U-589
Aspicilia cinerea [ECU] Growing on a boulder along the edge of the woodland on the western side of the power line clearing uphill from Locust Run; Elevation ; N 39o24.218' W 076o50.582' Google Map  (19 July 2006)
(6 April 1983) L-453
Buellia spuria [EGW] Collected and identified by EGW; on rock outcrops in open field. (9 March 1980) L-125
Caloplaca citrina [EGW] Collected and identified by EGW; near the MD Historical Marker at the Overlook, on rocks at top of slope with Placynthium nigrum. (28 September 1985) L-535[ECU] Growing on mortar on the wall of Red Dog Lodge; N 39o24.600' W 076o50.419' Google Map  (June 2003)
Caloplaca feracissima [EGW] Collected and identified by EGW; on rock outcrop in open field. (9 March 1980)[ECU] Growing on cement at the base of light pole in front of the Visitor's Center; N 39o24.609' W 076o50.325' Google Map  (June 2003)[ECU] Growing on a big rock near the metal gate under the BG&E high power lines at Ward's Chapel Road; N 39o25.141' W 076o50.487' Google Map  (June 2003)
Caloplaca lobulata ([EGW] Collected by Elmer Worthley, identified by Dr. Allen Skorepa; growing in full sunlight in open glade in oak-Virginia pine woods. (27 January 1979) LH-22
Caloplaca sideritis [EGW] Collected by Elmer Worthley, identified by Dr. Allen Skorepa; growing on rock outcrop in full sun. (27 January 1979) LH-21
Candelaria concolor [EGW] Collected and identified by EGW; on bark of Acer rubrum in woods opposite the Overlook. (3 April 1983) L-459[ECU] Growing on bark of red maple along the Orange Trail (Red Run Trail) east of the intersection of the Orange-Red-Yellow Trails; N 39o24.732' W 076o49.658' Google Map  (June 2003)
Candelariella vitellina [EGW] Collected by A. Norden and B. Norden, along Dolfield Road, on rock in full sun. (27 August 1973) L-464[EGW] Collected and identified by EGW, along Dolfield Road, on rock outcrops in open field. (9 March 1980) L-644[EGW] Collected by Elmer Worthley, identified by Allen C. Skorepa, on serpentine rocks in open field. (11 May 1980) L-594[ECU] Growing on a boulder on the west side of Deer Park Road near the Overlook Parking Area; N 39o24.892' W 076o50.161' Google Map  (June 2003)
Catapyrenium cinereum [EGW] Collected and identified by EGW; on bare places among clumps of Andropogon scoparius and Aristida dichotoma (8 January 1984) L-572
Circinaria caesiocinerea [EGW] Collected by Elmer Worthley and identified by Arnold Norden, on rock south side of Ward's Chapel Road. (24 December 1983) L-430[ECU] Growing on a large rock along west side of Deer Park Road north of the Overlook; N 39o24.888' W 076o50.156' Google Map  (June 2003)
[[Cladonia apodocarpa|Cladonia apodocarp]] [EGW] Collected and identified by EGW; on soil in open woods across from Overlook. (6 April 1983) L-5[ECU] Growing on soil near the intersection of Deer Park Road and the old gravel road leading to the Visitor's Center. N 39o24.728' W 076o50.142' Google Map  (June 2003)[ECU] Growing on soil in a field near the metal gate under the BG&E high power lines at Ward's Chapel Road; N 39o25.144' W 076o50.468' Google Map  (June 2003)
Cladonia arbuscula [S,N,W] Growing under pines.[EGW] Collected and identified by EGW; on soil under Pinus virginiana. (28 September 1985) L-96[ECU] Growing on soil south of Dolfield Road; N 39o24.110' W 076o49.374' Google Map  (June 2003)
Cladonia atlantica [S,N,W] On soil under pines.
Cladonia boryi  (probably a misidentification)
Cladonia caespiticia  Flörke[ECU] On very rotten wood in the woodland south of Dolfield Road; N 39o24.146' W 076o49.242' Google Map  (June 2003)
Cladonia cariosa [EGW] Collected and identified by Elmer Worthley; on rock outcrop in open field near Ward's Chapel Road. (9 March 1980) L-9
Cladonia caroliniana [ECU] Growing on soil c.  west of the picnic tables near Red Dog Lodge. (June 2003)
Cladonia chlorophaea [S,N,W] Growing on rotting wood in open woods.[EGW] Collected and identified by EGW; on rock outcrop in open field near Ward's Chapel Road. (9 March 1980) L-22
Cladonia ciliata var. tenuis [EGW] Collected and identified by EGW; on sterile soil with Andropogon scoparius. (16 December 1949) LH-28 (a misidentification)
Cladonia coccifera [EGW] Collected and identified by EGW; on soil under Quercus stellata. (3 April 1983) L-23 (a misidentification of a form of Cladonia cristatella)
Cladonia coniocraea [ECU] On a rock at a rock pile near a rusty tub along the Serpentine Trail (south section); N 39o24.483' W 076o51.031' Google Map  (June 2003)[ECU] Growing on an old carpet in a woodland located at the SW corner of the Serpentine Trail; N 39o24.465' W 076o51.034' Google Map  (June 2003)
Cladonia cristatella (AKA British Soldiers) [S,N,W] Growing on rotting wood in open woods.[EGW] Collected and identified by EGW; on soil around bases of Andropogon. (16 December 1949) LH-23[ECU] Growing about midway up the grassy hillside between the woodland and power lines near the Serpentine Trail (White Trail); N 39o24.686' W 076o50.492' Google Map  (June 2003)
Cladonia gracilis  subsp. gracilis[S,N,W] On soil among grasses.[EGW] Collected and identified by EGW; on soil in woods opposite the Overlook. (6 April 1983) L-50
Cladonia grayi [ECU] Growing at the base of a small tree stump (only several inches high) close to the Serpentine Trail (south section); N 39o24.524' W 076o51.041' Google Map  (June 2003)
Cladonia macilenta var. bacillaris [S,N,W] Growing on trees in open woods.
Cladonia parasitica [ECU] Growing on a dead limb on the ground. Down hill from the log cabin cellar near a stream.; N 39o24.340' W 076o50.303' Google Map  (31 May 2006) U-601
Cladonia peziziformis [EGW] Collected and identified by EGW; on soil under Pinus virginiana near the Overlook. (3 April 1983) L-62[ECU] Growing on top of a pile of asphalt near the beginning of the north section of the Red Trail; N 39o24.913' W 076o50.127' Google Map  (June 2003)
Cladonia pleurota [S,N,W] On soil under pines.[ECU] Growing on soil along the wood edge on the eastern side of the power line clearing north of the Serpentine Trail; N 39o25.042' W 076o50.462' Google Map  (June 2003)[ECU] Growing on an old piece of cotton cloth at the edge of a woodland west of Deer Park Road; N 39o24.439' W 076o50.085' Google Map  (13 May 2006)
Cladonia rei [ECU] Growing along the gravel road between Deer Park Road and the Visitor's Center; N 39o24.699' W 076o50.186' Google Map  (June 2003)
Cladonia squamosa [EGW] Collected and identified by EGW; on rock outcrops in open field. (9 March 1980) LH-25
Cladonia subcariosa Syn.: Cladonia sobolescens Syn.: Cladonia clavulifera [ECU] An extensive patch of this lichen can be found growing near the metal gate under the high voltage power lines along Ward's Chapel Road; N 39o25.130' W 076o50.487' Google Map  (June 2003)
Cladonia subtenuis [S,N,W] Growing on soil under scrub pines.[EGW] Collected and identified by EGW; growing near Ward's Chapel Road under Virginia pine. (11 May 1980) L-583[ECU] Growing along the western section of the Dolfield Trail (Yellow Trail), about midway between the intersection of the Red-Orange-Yellow Trails and Dolfield Road; N 39o24.407' W 076o49.497' Google Map  (June 2003)[ECU] Growing along the Serpentine Trail near a large pile of wood chips; N 39o24.611' W 076o50.620' Google Map  (June 2003)
Cladonia uncialis [S,N,W] Growing on serpentine soil under pines.
Dibaeis baeomyces [EGW] Collected and identified by EGW; on soil of road bank. (15 March 1980) & L-423
Flavoparmelia baltimorensis [ECU] Growing on a rock in a woodland near the trail behind the Visitor's Center; N 39o24.542' W 076o50.370' Google Map  (June 2003)[ECU] Growing on "lichen rock", in the woodland on the west side of the power line clearing between the White (Serpentine) Trail and Ward's Chapel Road; N 39o24.970' W 076o50.526' Google Map  (June 2003)
Flavoparmelia caperata [S,N,W] Growing on rocks in open area.[ECU] Growing on bark of a fallen oak limb along the Serpentine Trail east of the SW corner; N 39o24.477' W 076o51.005' Google Map  (June 2003)
Hypocenomyce scalaris [EGW] Collected and identified by A. Norden and B. Ball; on trunk of pine at edge of open field along Ward's Chapel Road. (16 February 1974) L-466[EGW] Collected by Elmer Worthley and identified by Arnold "Butch" Norden; at base of Pinus virginiana, from ground level up about l foot. Tree located about 100 yards downhill from Red Dog Lodge. (8 January 1984) L-467
Imshaugia aleurites [EGW] Collected and identified by B. Ball and A. Norden; on scrub pines along Dolfield Road. (14 April 1974) L-262[EGW] Collected and identified by EGW; on bark of Pinus virginiana. (6 April 1983) L-266[ECU] Growing on bark of a Virginia pine near the intersection of the Red-Yellow-Orange Trails; N 39o24.728' W 076o49.753' Google Map  (June 2003)
Imshaugia placorodia [EGW] Collected and identified by A. Norden and B. Ball; on branches of scrub pines along Dolfield Road. (14 April 1974) L-268[EGW] Collected and identified by EGW; on branches of Virginia pine; often grows with Imshaugia aleurites and Ahtiana aurescens. (9 March 1980) L-269[EGW] Collected and identified by EGW; on bark of Pinus virginiana, opposite the Overlook. (3 April 1983) L-270Growing on a pole-like stump of a dead Virginia pine sticking out into the trail north of Dolfield Road; N 39o24.242' W 076o49.338' Google Map  (June 2003)
(19 December 1983) L-472
Lecanora expallens [EGW] Collected identified by EGW; on decorticated stump of Juniperus virginiana. (6 April 1983) L-476[EGW] Collected and identified by EGW; on dead decorticated branch lying on the ground. (December 1983) L-478
Lecanora strobilina [ECU] Growing on a fallen dead oak branch in the woodland north of Ward's Chapel Road; N 39o25.040' W 076o51.175' Google Map  (June 2003)
Lecidella carpathica [ECU] Growing on a boulder along the edge of the woodland on the western side of the power line clearing uphill from Locust Run; Elevation ; N 39o24.218' W 076o50.582' Google Map  (19 July 2006)
Lecidella stigmatea [ECU] Growing on a boulder along the edge of the woodland on the western side of the power line clearing uphill from Locust Run; Elevation ; N 39o24.218' W 076o50.582' Google Map  (19 July 2006)
Lepraria lobificans [ECU] Growing at the base of a Virginia pine near where the Serpentine Trail crosses a stream; N 39o24.483' W 076o51.031' Google Map  (June 2003)
Lepraria neglecta [ECU] Growing on a boulder marking the beginning of the north section of the Red Trail close to Deer Park Road; N 39o24.919' W 076o50.163' Google Map  (June 2003)
(10 December 1983) L-474[ECU] Growing at the base of a large oak tree along the gravel road in the section north of Ward's Chapel Road. (June 2003)
Parmelia sulcata [EGW] Collected and identified by a botany student. (5 December 1978) L-293
Parmelinopsis minarum [EGW] Collected and identified by EGW; on decorticated branch, just southwest of big pipe under Dolfield Road. L-299
Parmotrema hypotropum [ECU] Growing on bark of a chestnut oak along the Orange Trail between the Orange-Red-Yellow Trail intersection and the Orange-Yellow Trail intersection; N 39o24.692' W 076o49.510' Google Map  (June 2003)[ECU] Growing on a rock in the woodland east of the BG&E high voltage power lines north of the Serpentine Trail; N 39o24.896' W 076o50.447' Google Map  (June 2003)[ECU] Growing on a large rock in the woodland west of the BG&E high voltage power lines north of the Serpentine Trail; N 39o24.970' W 076o50.526' Google Map  (June 2003)
Pertusaria paratuberculilfera [ECU] Growing on bark on the trunk of a fallen oak near Locust Run on the western side of the power lines; elevation ; N 39o24.142' W 076o50.351' Google Map  (9 July 2006) U-632
Phaeophyscia pusilloides [ECU] Growing on Ailanthus altissima near the old Chromite Mill foundation in the section north of Ward's Chapel Road; N 39o25.020' W 076o51.150' Google Map  (June 2003)
Phaeophyscia rubropulchra Growing on bark of Ailanthus altissima near the old Chromite Mill foundation in the section north of Ward's Chapel Road; N 39o25.020' W 076o51.150' Google Map  (June 2003)
Physcia adscendens [EGW] Collected and identified by EGW; on marble of old grave stone, growing with Physconia detersa, Lecanora dispersa and Xanthomendoza fallax. (19 December 1983) L-145
Physcia aipolia [EGW] Collected and identified by EGW; on rock outcrop. (9 March 1980) L-153
Physcia millegrana [ECU] Growing on a pole-like tree trunk directly in front of the Overlook Parking Area on Deer Park Road; N 39o24.863' W 076o50.154' Google Map  (June 2003)[ECU] Growing on a woodland rock near the picnic tables south of Red Dog Lodge; N 39o24.604' W 076o50.440' Google Map  (June 2003)
Physcia subtilis [ECU] Growing on a boulder on the west side of Deer Park Road north of the Overlook Parking Area; N 39o24.897' W 076o50.162' Google Map  (June 2003)
Physconia detersa [EGW] Collected and identified by EGW; on old marble gravestone. Growing with Phaeophyscia adiastola, Lecanora dispersa and Xanthomendoza fallax. (19 December 1983) L-174
Placidium lacneum [EGW] Collected and identified by EGW; on rock outcrop in open field. (9 March 1980) L-575
Porpidia crustulata 
Porpidia macrocarpa [ECU] Growing on a rock in a pile of rocks near a rusty tub along the south section of the Serpentine Trail; N 39o24.483' W 076o51.031' Google Map  (June 2003)
Psorula rufonigra [S,N,W] Growing on rock in serpentine barrens.
Punctelia rudecta [EGW] Collected and identified by EGW; on Quercus marilandica, near Dolfield Road on downstream side from the big pipeline under the road. (19 December 1983) L-339[ECU] Growing on bark at the base of a Virginia pine along the Orange Trail east of the intersection of the Orange-Red-Yellow Trails; N 39o24.736' W 076o49.653' Google Map  (June 2003)[ECU] Growing at the base of an oak along the Serpentine Trail near Deer Park Road north of the Overlook Area; N 39o24.889' W 076o50.384' Google Map  (June 2003)
Punctelia subrudecta [S,N,W] Growing on trunks of pines.[EGW] Collected and identified by A. Norden and B. Ball; on trunks of pines in dry portions of the serpentine barrens. (11 April 1974) L-340[ECU] On trunk of Virginia pine with a large poison ivy vine attached to it; along the Serpentine Trail near a barbed wire fence west of Red Dog Lodge; N 39o24.490' W 076o50.965' Google Map  (June 2003)[ECU] Growing on a pine cone found on the ground under a Virginia pine near the cattle fence west of Red Dog Lodge; N 39o24.490' W 076o50.965' Google Map  (June 2003)
Pyxine sorediata [ECU] Growing on an old blue carpet in a woodland at the SW corner of the Serpentine Trail; N 39o24.465' W 076o51.034' Google Map  (June 2003)
Rimelia reticulata [EGW] (no information) L-351
Tuckermanella fendleri [S,N,W] On branches of pines.
Tuckermannopsis ciliaris [S,N,W] On branches of pines.[EGW] Collected and identified by A. Norden and B. Ball; on branches of scrub pines in moist areas. (11 April 1974) L-353[EGW] Collected and identified by EGW; on dead decorticated limb of Pinus virginiana, near Dolfield Road in pine woods near downstream end of pipe under the road. (1 January 1983) L-355[ECU] Growing on a shrub near the stream north of Dolfield Road; N 39o24.208' W 076o49.320' Google Map  (June 2003)
Verrucaria nigrescens [S,N,W] Growing on serpentine rock.[ECU] Growing on a serpentine rock in a field west of Deer Park Road, in the vicinity of a small stream; Elevation , N 39o24.391' W 076o50.080' Google Map  (31 May 2006) U-599

Xanthoparmelia conspersa [EGW] Collected and identified by EGW; on rock outcrop in open field, with Cladonia squamosa. (9 March 1980) L-395
Xanthoparmelia plittii [ECU] Growing on a boulder along the west side of Deer Park Road near the Overlook Parking Area; N 39o24.883' W 076o50.153' Google Map  (June 2003)[ECU] Growing on a large rock near the metal gate under the BG&E high power lines at Ward's Chapel Road; N 39o25.144' W 076o50.480' Google Map  (June 2003)
Xanthoparmelia stenophylla [EGW] Syn. Xanthoparmelia somloënsis (Gyelnik) Hale. Collected and identified by EGW (no data) L-604

See also
List of lichens of Maryland
List of ferns and fern allies of Soldiers Delight
List of graminoids of Soldiers Delight
List of woody plants of Soldiers Delight
List of wildflowers of Soldiers Delight

External links
Maryland Dept. Natural Resources — "Guide to the Soldiers Delight Natural Environmental Area"

References

Flenniken, Don G. 1999. The Macrolichens in West Virginia. Carlisle Printing, Sugar Creek Ohio 44681, 231 pages plus plates.
Lee, David S. 1991. Elmer George Worthley- A Maryland Naturalist. The Maryland Naturalist. Volume 35 (Number 1–4), pages 3–10.
Norden, Arnold W. 1991. Editor's Page (Obituary of Dr. Elmer G. Worthley). The Maryland Naturalist. Volume 35 (Number 1–4), pages 1–2.
Skorepa publications (see Allen C. Skorepa).
Thomson, John W. 1967. The Lichen Genus Cladonia in North America. University of Toronto Press, Canada, 172 pages.
Uebel, Edward C. 2000. Maryland Bryophytes Collected by Elmer G. Worthley. The Maryland Native Plant Society, P.O. Box 4877, Silver Spring, Maryland 20914, 100 pages.
Wennerstrom, Jack. 1995. Soldiers Delight Journal. Exploring a Globally Rare Ecosystem. University of Pittsburgh Press, Pittsburgh, 247 pages.

Lists of lichens
Soldiers Delight
Soldiers Delight related